The 18117 / 18118 Rajya Rani Express is an Express train belonging to Indian Railways South Eastern Railway zone that runs between  and  in India. This train is a part of Rajya Rani Express series from Odisha state.

It operates as train number 18117 from Rourkela Junction to Gunupur and as train number 18118 in the reverse direction, serving the states of  Odisha.

Coaches
The 18117 / 18 Rajya Rani  Express has one AC 2 Tier, two AC 3 Tier, 6 Sleeper class, 6 general unreserved & two SLR (seating with luggage rake) coaches . It does not carry a pantry car.

As is customary with most train services in India, coach composition may be amended at the discretion of Indian Railways depending on demand.

Service

Route & Halts

Traction
As the route is going to be electrified, a Bondamunda-based WDM-3A diesel locomotive pulls the train to its destination.

References

External links
18417 Rajya Rani  Express at India Rail Info
18418 Rajya Rani  Express at India Rail Info

Rajya Rani Express trains
Transport in Rourkela
Rail transport in Odisha